Foxley is a village and civil parish in the Breckland district of Norfolk, England.

Foxley may also refer to:

Places
 Foxley, Glasgow, Scotland 
 Foxley, Herefordshire, England
 Foxley, Staffordshire, England
 Foxley, Wiltshire, England
 Foxley River, Prince Edward Island, Canada

Other uses
 Foxley (surname)
 Operation Foxley, a plan to assassinate Adolf Hitler

See also
 Foxley-Norris
 "Galloping Foxley"